Arith may refer to:

Places
 Arith, Savoie, Auvergne-Rhône-Alpes, France
 Mount Arith, Albania

Other
 ARITH Symposium on Computer Arithmetic), annual IEEE conference
 ARITH-MATIC, programming language